Lenart pri Gornjem Gradu is a dispersed settlement in the hills northwest of Gornji Grad in Slovenia. The area belongs to the traditional region of Styria and is now included in the Savinja Statistical Region.

Name
The name of the settlement was changed from Sveti Lenart (literally, 'Saint Leonard') to Lenart pri Gornjem Gradu (literally, 'Leonard near Gornji Grad') in 1955. The name was changed on the basis of the 1948 Law on Names of Settlements and Designations of Squares, Streets, and Buildings as part of efforts by Slovenia's postwar communist government to remove religious elements from toponyms.

Church
The local church, from which the settlement gets its name, is built on a hill in the western part of the settlement. It is dedicated to Saint Leonard and belongs to the Parish of Gornji Grad. It was first mentioned in written documents dating to 1426. It has a rectangular nave with a narrower and lower sanctuary and a southern belfry.

References

External links
Lenart pri Gornjem Gradu on Geopedia

Populated places in the Municipality of Gornji Grad